Yona Markova (1855–1923), was a Bulgarian soldier and war heroine.  She became famous as a war heroine as she served as a Bulgarian soldier during the Serbo-Bulgarian War posing as a man. She was decorated with two military medals for bravery in combat.

References

1923 deaths
1855 births
Women in 19th-century warfare
People of the Serbo-Bulgarian War
19th-century Bulgarian military personnel
Women in European warfare